Panaah may refer to: 

 Panaah (TV series), a TV series aired on DD National
 Panaah (film), a film released in 1992